Annette Elizabeth Salmeen (born December 7, 1974) is an American biochemist, a 1997 Rhodes Scholar and a gold medalist at the 1996 Summer Olympics.

Swimming career
Salmeen was born in Ann Arbor, Michigan.  She was a competitive swimmer by the age of 9, and became a standout swimmer at Huron High School in Ann Arbor, where she was co-captain of the girls' swimming team for two years. While at Huron, Salmeen was three-time state champion in the 500-yard freestyle, and once in the 100-yard butterfly. Salmeen went on to swim at the University of California, Los Angeles (UCLA), where she was a co-captain, four-time All-American, and an NCAA national champion in the 200-yard butterfly. She won a bronze medal in the 200-meter butterfly at the 1995 World University Games in Fukuoka, Japan. Salmeen qualified for the U.S. Olympic Team for the 1996 Summer Olympics in Atlanta, Georgia, where she earned a gold medal for swimming for the winning U.S. team in the preliminary heats of the women's 4×200-meter freestyle relay. In individual competition at the Olympics, she finished 4th in the B Final (12th overall) in the women's 200-meter butterfly.

Rhodes Scholarship 
Salmeen graduated from UCLA in 1997 with a Bachelor of Science in chemistry, and was awarded a Rhodes Scholarship to pursue a Doctorate of Philosophy (D. Phil.) in biochemistry at Oxford University. During her four years at St John's College, Oxford, she was a member of the Oxford University Swimming Club, where she set three long-course records and six on the short-course.

Stanford University 
She earned her doctorate in 2001, and returned to the U.S. as a postdoctoral fellow at Stanford University. In 2005, she was named to the board of the United States Anti-Doping Agency and again came back to Stanford University where she teaches as of 2022.

See also
 List of Olympic medalists in swimming (women)
 List of University of California, Los Angeles people

References

1974 births
Living people
Alumni of St John's College, Oxford
American women biochemists
American female butterfly swimmers
American female freestyle swimmers
American Rhodes Scholars
Olympic gold medalists for the United States in swimming
Sportspeople from Ann Arbor, Michigan
Stanford University postdoctoral scholars
Swimmers at the 1996 Summer Olympics
UCLA Bruins women's swimmers
American women chemists
Medalists at the 1996 Summer Olympics
Universiade medalists in swimming
Universiade bronze medalists for the United States
Medalists at the 1995 Summer Universiade
20th-century American women